Parque Chacabuco is a neighbourhood in Buenos Aires, Argentina. Its name is due to Chacabuco Park, which is in its centre, taking the name from the Battle of Chacabuco.

Geography
It is located in the centre-south of Buenos Aires. It limits to the north with Caballito through Directorio Avenue, to the west with Flores through Carabobo Av, Curapaligüe Av and Camilo Torres St, to the south with Nueva Pompeya through Riestra Av. and Cobo Av, and to the east with Boedo through La Plata Avenue.

Day of the neighbourhood: May 15

External links 

  Parque Chacabuco Website
  Barriada Parque Chacabuco
  Digital Neighbourhood Newspaper

Neighbourhoods of Buenos Aires